The 1992 Cleveland Thunderbolts season was the 2nd season for the franchise, and their first in Cleveland, Ohio after relocating from Columbus, Ohio. They went 4–6 and lost in the playoffs to the Orlando Predators.

Regular season

Schedule

Standings

z – clinched homefield advantage

y – clinched division title

x – clinched playoff spot

Playoffs

Roster

External links
1992 Cleveland Thunderbolts at ArenaFan.com

Cleveland Thunderbolts
Cleveland Thunderbolts
Cleveland Thunderbolts seasons